Sengoku's gecko (Goniurosaurus sengokui) is a species of gecko. It is endemic to the Ryukyu Islands of Japan and only found on two islands in the Okinawa group: Tokashiki Island and Aka Island.

References

Goniurosaurus
Endemic reptiles of Japan
Endemic fauna of the Ryukyu Islands
Reptiles described in 2017